Chase is a term used in the United Kingdom to define a type of land reserved for hunting use by its owner.  Similarly, a Royal Chase is a type of Crown Estate by the same description, where the hunting rights are reserved for a member of the British Royal Family. 

The term ‘chase’ is also used in Australia to describe some national parks. Flinders Chase National Park is on Kangaroo Island in South Australia and Ku-ring-gai Chase National Park is in New South Wales.

Rights and history
The Victoria County History describes a chase as:

"like a forest, uninclosed, and only defined by metes [houses and farmsteads within] and bounds [hills, highways, watercourses etc]; but it could be held by a subject. Offences committed therein were, as a rule, punishable by the common law and not by forest jurisdiction."

Chases are often identified by open clearings, soil type, and retaining additional heath rather than forests for hunting purposes. 

Chases faced mass enclosure by Private (specifically local) Acts of Parliament. This type of privatization primarily occurred through the heyday between 1600-1850. Enclosure converted many chases from public to private lands to some extent. After these conversions, in many areas the private lands were converted for residential, commercial, industrial or transport infrastructure use. However, the chases listed (see examples) remain largely undiminished by staying a Common, or by a gift to a public body whether to avoid inheritance tax or motivated by philanthropy.

Examples
Some examples of chases in England include Wyre Forest, which straddles Worcestershire and Shropshire, Malvern Chase in Worcestershire, and Pensnett Chase near Dudley.

Cannock Chase in Staffordshire had once been previously recognized during the Middle Ages as a Royal Forest; however, it has since been reverted to a chase and merged with Beaudesert, a property originally belonging to the Bishop of Lichfield.

Comparative status
Chases and Royal Chases are beneath the status of forests designations and Royal Forests, respectively.  Since the late Medieval Period, the word "forest" has come to mean any large woodland.  Virtually all of the National Parks, AONB forests or significant other forests have officers and laws that apply only to them.

See also
 Ancient woodland
 Hunting in the United Kingdom
 List of forests in the United Kingdom
 Medieval deer park
 Surveyor General of Woods, Forests, Parks, and Chases

References

Hunting and shooting in the United Kingdom